Carter Ward Elliott (November 29, 1893 – May 21, 1959) was a shortstop in Major League Baseball. He played for the Chicago Cubs.

References

External links

1893 births
1959 deaths
Major League Baseball shortstops
Chicago Cubs players
Portland Beavers players
Sacramento Senators players
Seattle Rainiers players
Baseball players from Kansas
People from Atchison, Kansas